Vanda jennae is a species of Vanda endemic to Sulawesi, Indonesia. It was discovered in 2005 by Jaap J. Vermeulen and Peter O'Byrne.

Description
The flowers show red stripes over a white base colour. The fragrance is reported to be very intense. This species is part of the section Deltoglossa within the genus Vanda.

References

Plants described in 2005
Flora of Indonesia
Flora of Sulawesi
Endemic flora of Sulawesi
Endemic flora of Indonesia
jennae